The 2020 FIA World Rally Championship-3, an auto racing championship for rally cars that was recognised by the Fédération Internationale de l'Automobile as the third-highest tier of international rallying. It was open to privately-entered cars complying with R5 regulations and was the seventh running of the championship.

Pierre-Louis Loubet and Vincent Landais were the reigning drivers' and co-drivers' champions. Jari Huttunen and Mikko Lukka won the 2020 WRC-3 titles.

Calendar

Entries
The following crews compete in the 2020 World Rally Championship-3:

Changes
In 2019, the championship was run as the World Rally Championship-2, while the category known as the World Rally Championship-2 Pro was for professional crews entered by manufacturer teams. However, the multi-class structure was found to be too confusing, and so the category was re-structured for the 2020 season. Professional crews contested the World Rally Championship-2 and privateers contested the World Rally Championship-3.

Results and standings

Season summary

Scoring system
Points were awarded to the top ten classified finishers in each event. Unlike the World Rally Championship, points are not awarded for the Power Stage.

FIA World Rally Championship-3 for Drivers
(Results key)

FIA World Rally Championship-3 for Co-Drivers
(Results key)

Notes

References

External links
 
 FIA World Rally Championship-3 2020 at ewrc-results.com

 
World Rally Championship-3
World Rally Championship-3